Pahan may refer to:
 Mahout, name for a person who rides an elephant
 Dowkal Pahan, a village in Iran
 Bang Pahan District, a district in Thailand

See also 
 Pahang, a Malaysian state